Rome is the debut studio album from American contemporary R&B singer Rome, released April 15, 1997 via RCA Records. The album peaked at #30 on the Billboard 200 and at #7 on the Billboard R&B chart.

Three singles were released from the album: "I Belong to You (Every Time I See Your Face)", "Do You Like This" and "Crazy Love". "I Belong to You" was the most successful single from the album, peaking at #6 on the Billboard Hot 100 in 1997. In addition to original songs, the album contains a cover of Bobby Womack's "That's the Way I Feel About Cha".

The album was certified platinum by the RIAA on December 17, 1997.

Track listing

Charts

Weekly charts

Year-end charts

Certifications

References

External links
 
 

1997 debut albums
RCA Records albums
Rome (singer) albums